Four vessels of the British Royal Navy have been named HMS Bustard after the Bustard:

  was launched in 1803 as the brig Royal George for the Revenue Service. The Royal Navy purchased her in 1806 and renamed her HMS Bustard. She served on active duty between 1808 and 1815, distinguishing herself in operations in the Mediterranean. The Royal Navy sold her in 1815 and she became the whaler Royal George. She made three whaling voyages and was lost in 1825 on her fourth. 
  was an  wood screw gunboat; she was sold at Hong Kong in 1869.
  was an  iron screw gunboat; listed until 1921 but possibly sold in November 1917.

Royal Navy ship names